Liliane Nemri  is a Lebanese actress and comedian who has acted in Lebanese movies and series.

Filmography

TV series
Abou Melhem
Al 3a2ila al sa3ida
Al Mo3allima wal Ostaz
Sett El habayeb Ya Baba
Bentein w Sabi
Es7a Ya neyem
A7la 3alam
Shou bado ysir
Oul Nchalla
Kella Mel7a
Ghadan Yawmon Akhar
Imra2a men daya3
Erbet Ten7al
Jamil w Jamile
Kallemni Arabi
Abou el 3abed
Ma2lab Mrattab
3ammi Kou
She22a fo2 She22a
Alkhadaj
Abdo w abdo
Se3a bel ize3a
Mech zabta
Jamil and Jamileh (2001)
Ahdam chi (2010)

References

Lebanese film actresses
Lebanese television actresses
Living people
1960 births